Facing Mirrors is a 2011 Iranian drama film directed and co-written by Negar Azarbayjani. The film's producer and co-writer is Fereshteh Taerpoor.

Plot
Rana and Adineh (Eddie), two people of different backgrounds and social class are brought together to share a cab ride. Rana, inexperienced, religious and bound by traditions, is forced to drive a cab in order to survive financially and support her family. Adineh, wealthy yet rebellious, has escaped from their home and an upcoming arranged marriage. Together they share a cab ride.

In the middle of their journey in the cab, Rana realizes that her passenger Adineh is transgender, and is planning on having an operation. For Rana, comprehending and accepting such reality is difficult and equal to surpassing all she believes in and traditions she values. Together they forge an unlikely friendship rooted in their newfound independence.

Cast
 Homayoun Ershadi as Pedar
 Shayesteh Irani as Adineh (Eddie)
 Nima Shahrokh Shahi as Brother
 Ghazal Shakeri as Rana
Saber Abar as Sadegh (Saber Abbar)

Awards and nominations
At the Asia Pacific Screen Awards, Shayesteh Irani was nominated for Best Performance. The film was nominated to win Scythian Deer for Grand Prix and has been awarded the Special Mention Prize of the Ecumenical Jury for Feature Film at the Molodist International Film Festival.

At San Francisco's Frameline Film Festival in 2012, Facing Mirrors received "Best First Feature" award for Negar Azarbayjani's first feature. In the eighteenth edition of the LGBT film festival held in Paris, Negar Azarbayjani won the Grand Prix prize at Chéries-Chéris 2012. The film won against nine other competitors in the official selection.

See also
 List of lesbian, gay, bisexual or transgender-related films of 2011
 List of LGBT-related films directed by women
 Transsexuality in Iran

References

External links
 

2011 films
2011 drama films
2011 LGBT-related films
2011 directorial debut films
Iranian LGBT-related films
2010s Persian-language films
LGBT-related drama films
Transgender-related films
Iranian drama films